Brittany Reinbolt (born April 12, 1984) is an American bobsledder.

She participated at the IBSF World Championships 2019, winning a medal.

References

External links

1984 births
Living people
American female bobsledders
Sportspeople from Riverside, California
21st-century American women